Penicillium diversum is an anamorph species of the genus of Penicillium which produces austinol, isoaustin and diversonol.

See also
 List of Penicillium species

References

Further reading

 
 
 
 
 
 

diversum
Fungi described in 1997